In the Zohar,  Lurianic Kabbalah and Hermetic Qabalah, the qliphoth/qlippoth/qlifot/klifot/kelifot/qelifot/kliffoth, or kelipot/qelipot/qelippot/klippot/kellipot  ( qəlīpōṯ, originally Aramaic:  qəlīpīn, plural of  qəlīpā; literally "peels", "shells", or "husks"), are the representation of evil or impure spiritual forces in Jewish mysticism, the polar opposites of the holy Sefirot. The realm of evil is also termed Sitra Achra (Aramaic:  sīṭrāʾ ʾaḥrāʾ, the "Other Side") in Kabbalah texts.

In the Zohar

The Qlippot are first mentioned in the Zohar, where they are described as being created by God to function as a nutshell for holiness. The text subsequently relays an esoteric interpretation of the text of Genesis 1:14, which describes God creating the moon and sun to act as "luminaries" in the sky. The verse uses a defective spelling of the Hebrew word for "luminaries", resulting in a written form identical to the Hebrew word for "curses". In the context of the Zohar, interpreting the verse as calling the moon and sun "curses" is given mystic significance, personified by a description of the moon descending into the realm of Beri'ah, where it began to belittle itself and dim its own light, both physically and spiritually. The resulting darkness gave birth to the qlippot. Reflecting this, they are thenceforth generally synonymous with "darkness" itself.

Later, the Zohar gives specific names to some of the qlippot, relaying them as counterparts to certain sephirot: Mashchith ( mašḥīṯ, "destroyer") to Chesed, Aph ( ʾap̄, "anger") to Gevurah, and Chemah ( ḥēmā, "wrath") to Tiferet. It also names Avon, ( ʿāvōn, "iniquity"), Tohu ( ṯōhū, "formless"), Bohu ( ḇōhū, "void"), Esh ( ʿēš, "fire"), and Tehom ( təhōm, "deep"), but does not relate them to any corresponding sephira. Though the Zohar clarifies that each of the Sephirot and Qlippot are 1:1, even down to having equivalent partzufim, it does not give all of their names.

In Lurianic Kabbalah

In the Kabbalistic cosmology of Isaac Luria, the qlippot are metaphorical "shells" or "peels" surrounding holiness. They are the innate spiritual obstacles to holiness, and receive their existence from God only in an external and circumstantial manner, rather than an internal and direct manner. In this sense, qlippot have a slightly beneficial function, as much like a peel protects a fruit, so do the qlippot technically prevent the flow of Divinity (revelation of God's true unity) from being dissipated as it permeates throughout the various facets of Creation. Nevertheless, as a consequence, the qlippoth conceal this holiness, and are therefore synonymous with what runs counter to Jewish thought, like idolatry, impurity, rejection of Divine unity (dualism), and with the Sitra Achra, the perceived realm opposite to holiness. Much like their holy counterparts, qlippot emerge in a descending seder hishtalshelus (Chain of Being) through Tzimtzum (God's action of contracting His Ohr Ein Sof, "infinite light", in order to provide a space for Creation).  Kabbalah distinguishes between two "realms" in qlippot, three completely impure qlippot ( haṭmēʾōṯ, literally "the unclean [ones]") and the remainder of intermediate qlippot ( nōgah, literally "light"). The qlippot nogah are "redeemable", and can be refined and sublimated, whereas the qlippot hatme'ot can only be redeemed by their own destruction. 

Similar to a certain interpretation of the Kabbalistic Tree of Life, the qlippoth are sometimes imagined as a series of concentric circles which surround not just aspects of God, but also one another. Their four concentric terms derived from various phrases used in Ezekiel's famous vision of the Throne of God (Ezekiel 1:4), itself the focus of a school of Jewish mystic thought, "And I looked and behold, a whirlwind came out of the north, a great cloud, and a fire infolding itself, and a brightness was about it..." The whirlwind, great cloud, and infolding fire are associated with the aforementioned three "impure" qlippot, with the "brightness" associated with the "intermediate" qlippot. In medieval Kabbalah, it was believed that the Shekhinah (God's presence) is separated from the Sefirot by man's sins, while in Lurianic Kabbalah it was believed the Shekhinah was exiled to the qlippot due to the "shattering" of Divinity into Tohu and Tikun, which is a natural part of its cosmological model of Creation. This in turn causes the Sephirot's various "Sparks of Holiness" to be exiled in the qlippot as well, thereby causing these respective qlippoth to manifest as either the qlippot nogah or qlippot hatme'ot. From there, the qlippot nogah would be redeemed through the observance of mitzvah, whereas the qlippot hatme'ot would be indirectly "redeemed" through abiding by the negative prohibitions put forth by the 613 commandments. In addition to righteous living, genuine repentance also allows the qlippot to be redeemed, as it retrospectively turns sin into virtue and darkness into light, and thus deprives the qlippot of their vitality. According to  Lurianic Doctrine, when all the Sparks of Holiness are freed from the qlippot, the Messianic era will begin. 

In Hasidic philosophy, which is underlined by panentheistic and monistic thought, the qlippot are viewed as a representation of the ultimately acomistic self-awareness of Creation. The Kabbalistic scheme of qlippot is internalized as a psychological exercise, by focusing on the self, opposite to devekut, or the practice of "self-nullification" in order to better grasp mystic contemplation.

Hermetic Qabalah magical views
In some non-Jewish Hermetic Qabalah, contact is sought with the Qliphoth unlike in the ethical-mystical Jewish prohibition, as part of its process of human self-knowledge. In contrast, the theurgic Jewish Practical Kabbalah was understood by its practitioners as similar to white magic, accessing only holiness, while the danger inherent in such ventures involving the intermingling of holiness and impure Magic ensured that accessing the Qlipoth remained a minor and restricted practice in Jewish history.

Mathers' interpretation

Christian Knorr von Rosenroth's Latin Kabbala denudata (1684) (translated The Kabbalah Unveiled by MacGregor Mathers) equates these forces with the Kings of Edom and also offers the suggestion they are the result of an imbalance towards Gedulah, the Pillar of Mercy or the merciful aspect of God, and have since been destroyed.

In subsequent Hermetic teachings, the Qliphoth have tended, much like the sephirot, to be interpreted as mystical worlds or entities, and merged with ideas derived from demonology.

In most descriptions, there are seven divisions of Hell (Sheol or Tehom; Abaddon or Tzoah Rotachat; Be'er Shachat (בְּאֵר שַׁחַת, Be'er Shachath — "pit of corruption") or Mashchit; Bor Shaon (בּוֹר שָׁאוֹן — "cistern of sound") or Tit ha-Yaven (טִיט הַיָוֵן — "clinging mud"); Dumah or Sha'are Mavet (שַׁעֲרֵי מָוֶת, Sha'arei Maveth — "gates of death"); Neshiyyah (נְשִׁיָּה — "oblivion", "Limbo") or Tzalmavet; and Eretz Tachtit (אֶרֶץ תַּחְתִּית, Erets Tachtith — "lowest earth") or Gehenna), twelve Qliphotic orders of demons, three powers before Satan and twenty-two demons which correspond to the 22 letters of the Hebrew alphabet.

Crowley, Regardie, and Heidrick
According to Aleister Crowley, the three evil forms (before Samael), are said to be Qemetial, Belial, and Othiel.

Crowley (who call them "Orders of Qliphoth") and Israel Regardie lists the qliphoth as: תאומיאל (Thaumiel), עוגואל (Ghogiel), סאתאריאל (Satariel), געסכלה (Agshekeloh), גולחב (Golohab), תגרירון‎ (Tagiriron), ערב זרק (Gharab Tzerek), סמאל (Samael), גמיאל (Gamaliel), and לילית (Lilith).

Bill Heidrick gives his own interpretation on the adverse tree, saying that the spellings are "mostly reconstructions with alternatives. Nonetheless, it is believed that the majority of the above are at least suitable if not perfect". He also goes on to say that "These names are sometimes called the 'adverse Sephiroth' instead of the Demonic Orders. A. E. Waite makes this later point in his Holy Kabbalah, page 256."

In popular culture

 The Qliphoth (spelled "Qlippoth") has a heavy role in the "Book of the Fallen" supplement for Mage: The Ascension, 20th anniversary edition.  The Nephandi (Evil Mages) go through a spiritual journey very heavily influenced by the ideas present in the Qliphoth.
 A demonic tree named after the Qliphoth appears in the 2019 video game Devil May Cry 5. The demon Urizen uses its fruit to gain more power.
 In the 2007 visual novel Dies irae, one of the antagonists has a power called "Qliphoth Bacikal".
 The astral world's region of darkness is called Qliphoth in Berserk.
 In Fullmetal Alchemist, Edward Elric's door of truth is characterized by the Qliphoth.
 In Persona 5, the final area of the game is named the "Qliphoth World".
 In Black Clover, Dante, the leader of the antagonist group the Dark Triad, mentions a magic channel between the underworld and the regular world known as "The Tree of Qliphoth" which would allow for "Devils" to pour through the world.
 In Fate/Grand Order, a 2015 online free-to-play role-playing mobile game, has a character under the "Foreigner" class based on Abigail Williams. Her noble phantasm is named "Qliphoth Rhizome".
 In Lobotomy Corporation, the Qliphoth is a unit defining the stability of an Abnormality's behavior, with a minimum of 0, indicated by Qliphoth Counter above each containment unit. At 0, the Abnormality breaches containment.
In the game Counter:Side, the strongest group of Corrupted Objects are known as the "Demon Lords of Qliphoth". These beings come from the "Qlipha Dimension" and possesses "Divinity". Sometimes, these beings has fragments of their power knowns as "Qliphoth Factors", which is utilized by some Counters who can control or it or if they are chosen by that certain Demon Lord. Usage of this power, however, is dangerous since it hastens the Global Corruption Rate (or the destruction of the world).
In the Yu-Gi-Oh! Trading Card Game, there are a series of cards named the "Qliphort", a portmanteau Qliphoth and fort. Each card's name corresponds to a member of the Qliphoth and a concept in computing.
 In the Pathfinder Roleplaying Game, Qliphoth (spelled "Qlippoth") are an ancient race of Chaotic Evil outsiders that existed in the plane known as the Abyss long before mortals came into being. Though the qlippoth originally ruled the plane, the rapid reproduction of demons (formed from mortal souls sent to the Abyss) caused them to be outnumbered, displaced and nearly wiped out. Qlippoth are depicted as not only evil but extremely alien to human eyes, composed of nonsensical flesh and organs or possessing insectoid or squidlike forms, and the mere sight of them can cause harm to onlookers. Qlippoth seek to eradicate mortal life to end the production of demons, though a few have acquired worshippers and become demon lords themselves.

See also
 Fallen angel
 Ohr
 Satan
 Tohu and Tikun
 Tumah and taharah
 Yetzer hara

Notes

References
 The Early Kabbalah by Joseph Dan
 Kabbalah by Gershom Scholem
 Qabalah, Qliphoth and Goetic Magic by Thomas Karlsson 

 
Kabbalah
Hermetic Qabalah
Left-Hand Path
Kabbalistic words and phrases